Colin Gordon (27 April 1911 – 4 October 1972) was a British actor born in Ceylon.

Biography
He was educated at Marlborough College and Christ Church, Oxford. He made his first West End appearance in 1934 as the hind legs of a horse in a production of Toad of Toad Hall. From 1936 to 1939 he was a director with the Fred Melville Repertory Company in Brixton. He served in the army during the Second World War for six years.

Career
Gordon had a long career in British cinema and television from the 1940s to the 1970s, often playing government officials. His films include The Pink Panther and Casino Royale (both with Peter Sellers, alongside whom he made five films). In the ITC series The Prisoner (1967) he portrayed Number Two twice, in "A. B. and C." and later in "The General".

Gordon was a regular in another ITC production, The Baron, playing civil servant Templeton-Green opposite Steve Forrest. He also starred in The Invisible Man (1958 TV series) episode 'Play to Kill', (series 1, episode 6, 1959); was the host and occasional narrator of the 1969 London Weekend Television series The Complete and Utter History of Britain, (which arose from a pre-Monty Python collaboration between Michael Palin and Terry Jones); and, was the Airport Commandant in the 1967 Doctor Who story The Faceless Ones. He was also in Bachelor Father and made two notable guest appearances in Steptoe and Son, once in "The Holiday" and again in the 1972 episode "Live Now, P.A.Y.E Later" as a tax inspector whom Harold and Albert manage to get drunk when he calls with a query about the old man's income tax return. In 1961 he appeared as the Doctor in "The Lift" episode of Hancock's Half Hour. In 1970 he appeared in the UFO episode The Cat with Ten Lives. He also appeared as Walpole Gibb in the ATV/ITC series Hine in 1971.

Selected filmography

 Jim the Penman (1947) – Roberts
 Bond Street (1948) – Clerk in Travel Agency
 The Winslow Boy (1948) – (uncredited)
 It's Hard to Be Good (1948) – Neighbour with Baby (uncredited)
 Edward, My Son (1949) – Ellerby
 Helter Skelter (1949) – Chadbeater Longwick
 Golden Arrow (1949) – Connelly
 Traveller's Joy (1949) – Tom Wright
 The Third Visitor (1951) – Bill Millington
 The Long Dark Hall (1951) – Pound
 Circle of Danger (1951) – Col. Fairbairn
 Laughter in Paradise (1951) – Station Constable
 The Man in the White Suit (1951) – Hill
 The Lady with a Lamp (1951) 
 Green Grow the Rushes (1951) – Roderick Fisherwick
 Mandy (1952) – Woollard (Junior)
 The Hour of 13 (1952) – MacStreet
 Folly to Be Wise (1952) – Prof. James Mutch
 Grand National Night (1953) – Buns Darling
 Innocents in Paris (1953) – Customs Officer
 The Heart of the Matter (1953) – Secretary (uncredited)
 Up to His Neck (1955) – Lt. Cmdr. Sterning
 Little Red Monkey (1955) – Harry Martin, reporter
 John and Julie (1955) – Mr. Swayne
 Escapade (1955) – Deeson, reporter
 Jumping for Joy (1956) – Max, 1st Commentator
 Keep It Clean (1956) – Peter, Marquess of Hurlingford
 The Green Man (1956) – Reginald Willoughby-Cruft
 A Touch of the Sun (1956) – Cecil Flick
 Up in the World (1956) – Fletcher Hetherington
 The Extra Day (1956) – Sir George Howard
 The Key Man (1957) – Larry Parr
 The One That Got Away (1957) – Army Interrogator
 The Safecracker (1958) – Dakers
 Virgin Island (US: Our Virgin Island, 1958) – The Commissioner
 The Doctor's Dilemma (1958) – Newspaper Man
 The Crowning Touch (1959) – Stacey
 Alive and Kicking (1959) – Bird Watcher
 The Mouse That Roared (1959) – BBC Announcer
 Bobbikins (1959) – Dr. Phillips
 Please Turn Over (1959) – Maurice
 Carry On Constable (1960) – (uncredited)
 The Day They Robbed the Bank of England (1960) – Benge
 The Big Day (1960) – George Baker
 Make Mine Mink (1960) – (uncredited)
 His and Hers (1961) – TV Announcer
 Seven Keys (1961) – Mr. Barber
 House of Mystery (1961) – Burdon
 Very Important Person (1961) – Briggs
 Don't Bother to Knock (1961) – Rolsom
 Three on a Spree (1961) – Mitchell
 Crooks Anonymous (1962) – Drunk
 Night of the Eagle (1962) – Lindsay Carr
 Strongroom (1962) – Mr. Spencer
 In the Doghouse (1962) – Dean 
 The Devil's Agent (1962) – Count Dezsepalvy
 The Boys (1962) – Gordon Lonsdale
 The Running Man (1963) – Solicitor
 Heavens Above! (1963) – Prime Minister
 Bitter Harvest (1963) – Charles
 The Pink Panther (1963) – Tucker
 The Counterfeit Constable (1964) – Le dentiste W. Martin
 The Liquidator (1965) – Vicar
 The Psychopath (1966) – Dr. Glyn
 The Great St Trinian's Train Robbery (1966) – Noakes
 The Trygon Factor (1966) – Dice
 The Family Way (1966) – Mr. Hutton
 Casino Royale (1967) – Casino Director
 Don't Raise the Bridge, Lower the River (1968) – Mr. Hartford
 Subterfuge (1968) – Kitteridge
 Mischief (1969) – Mr. Crawford
 The Body Beneath (1970) – Graham Ford

References

External links
 

1911 births
1972 deaths
English male film actors
English male television actors
People educated at Marlborough College
Alumni of Christ Church, Oxford
20th-century English male actors
British Army personnel of World War II
British people in British Ceylon